Sternocera is a genus of jewel beetles belonging to the Julodinae subfamily.

Characteristics
There are 26 species in this genus. Some species—S. aequisignata and S. aurosignata—are used for beetlewing craft because of their iridescent wings.

Species

Gallery

References

External links

African Sternocera
Asian Sternocera
Revision of the African Sternocera - Holm & Gussmann (1992)

Buprestidae genera
Taxa named by Johann Friedrich von Eschscholtz